Takydromus sikkimensis, the Sikkim grass lizard, is a species of lizard in the family Lacertidae. It is endemic to India.

References

Takydromus
Reptiles described in 1888
Taxa named by Albert Günther
Endemic fauna of India
Reptiles of India